New Attitude may refer to the following:

New Attitude (TV series), a short lived American TV sitcom
New Attitude (album), the second studio album by Australian band Young Divas
"New Attitude" (song), a 1985 pop song by Patti Labelle
New Attitude EP, a 2006 EP by American indie rock band Dirty Projectors